Listed below are the dates and results for the 1986 FIFA World Cup qualification rounds for the Oceanian zone (OFC).

Four teams entered the competition. Two OFC members competed: Australia and New Zealand. They were joined by two non-OFC members, Israel and Chinese Taipei. Israel competed in the OFC tournament as they had been excluded from AFC competition since 1974, and Chinese Taipei were unable to compete in the AFC competition due to political conflict with China.

The competition had a group format, with each team playing each of the others twice between September and November 1985. The winner of the tournament was Australia, who qualified for the UEFA–OFC play-off against Scotland for a finals position. Australia lost, meaning that there were no OFC teams at the finals in Mexico.

Standings

Matches

Inter-confederation play-offs

The winning team of the OFC qualification tournament played the UEFA Group 7 runners-up in a home-and-away play-off. The winner of this play-off qualified for the 1986 FIFA World Cup.

Goalscorers

5 goals

 John Kosmina
 Dave Mitchell
 Zahi Armeli

4 goals

 Colin Walker

3 goals

 Žarko Odžakov
 Eli Ohana
 Rifaat Turk
 Steve Sumner

2 goals

 Avi Cohen
 Uri Malmilian
 Grant Turner

1 goal

 Graham Arnold
 Oscar Crino
 Robbie Dunn
 Ian Gray
 David Ratcliffe
 Chen Sing-an
 Nissim Cohen
 Moshe Selecter
 Allan Boath
 Malcolm Dunford
 Declan Edge
 Wynton Rufer

1 own goal

 Chun Keui Chiang (playing against Australia)

References

External links

 
OFC

FIFA World Cup qualification (OFC)
qual
FIFA World Cup